Catral is a town in the Valencian Community, Spain. Located in the south of the province of Alicante, in the region of Vega Baja del Segura. It had 8,105 inhabitants in 2007 according to the National Statistics Institute of Spain.

History 
Catral's origins are uncertain, as is the origin of the name. There are three theories: that the name is of Iberian origin (Kal turlthe, meaning "double peak", which would make reference tocloseCabezos of Albatera), which be of Hispanic origin (ofCastrum Altum,Villa fortified "in Latin) and Arab (Al-Qatrullät). In any case, the middle of 13th century ended the Muslim rule of Catral.

Conquered by the infant Alfonso for the Crown of Castile, he was awarded the Order of Santiago Catral sites and Callosa in 1255. However, the Castilian king reinstated the crown as in 1264. From 1296, Catral, like the southern half of the province, would go to the Crown of Aragon within the Attorney General Orihuela.

The town's farmland has increased significantly during the first two decades of the 18th century due to draining of wetlands, promoted by the Cardinal Belluga. In 1741, the 152 inhabitants of Catral paid 12,499 pounds for the title of Villa and his independence from Orihuela. In 1829, it was spared the devastating effects of an earthquake that destroyed much of the population of the region. Since then, it has held an annual thanksgiving to Saint Emigdio, patron saint against earthquakes, as a token of thanks for his intercession.

Economy 
Agriculture, citrus fruits, artichokes, cereals and olive trees (cultivated in orchards that are irrigated by canals which carry water from the Segura river) produce much of the wealth together with some livestock. Growth industries include furniture, distribution, textiles, construction, food, hides and tourism.

Distribution centres
Manufacturing, warehousing and logistic premises for retailers such as Retro Europe, Vitalgrana, Catral Export Grupo, S.l. and Chili Foot Wear.  The Wheeler International distribution centre is located in the industrial zone adjacent to the Autopista AP-7 exit 730.

Demographics 
Catral has had a significant population growth since the 1990s. According to the census of 2008, the municipality had 8629 inhabitants.

Government

Climate
Temperatures exceed 10 degrees in January and 26 degrees in July.

Notes and references
 Flag image by Eduardo Gomez and extracted, with the consent of your website Vexilla Hispánica, http://www.vexilologia.es.
 Web site Town Hall of Catral, https://web.archive.org/web/20150202185613/http://ayuntamientocatral.com/municipio.php

References

Municipalities in the Province of Alicante